Victory Park, also known as the Victory Park Memorial Complex is a park located in Tashkent, the capital of Uzbekistan. It was planned in honor of the 75th anniversary of the end of the Second World War.

Background
The project was announced by President Shavkat Mirziyoyev in a holiday address on Victory Day in 2019. When describing the park, he said that it will be the "practical embodiment of our admiration for the people's feat in that cruel war." It was also conceived during a visit by Russian President Vladimir Putin to Tashkent in October 2018. The Ministry of Defense, the Ministry of Culture and the Academy of Sciences of Uzbekistan worked on the creation of the park as a joint project. The park was officially opened on 9 May 2020 with full military honors.

Memorial complex 
Buildings such as a "Museum of Glory" were erected on the park's territory while designs such as an entrance arch were being installed. Historical memorabilia such as emblems, war flags and maps were added to the architectural ensemble of the park.

Ode to Fortitude
The Ode to Fortitude monument was erected in memory of Zulfiya Zakirova, an Uzbek mother who lost five sons during the war. The monument is located in the center of the park.

Museum of Glory 

The Museum of Glory or Shon-Sharaf State Museum in the park is erected in the form of a man-made mound, inside which is located the main pavilion of the park is an exhibition dedicated to the history of Uzbekistan's participation in World War II. The museum consists of six departments. All accompanying information about the exhibits is presented in Uzbek, Russian and English. The museum has more than 12.5 thousand exhibits. Separate sections dedicated to ministries and departments within the Armed Forces are organized. It is part of the Victory Park Memorial Complex, the head of which is an advisor to the Minister of Defense for Culture.

Particularities 
In September 2020, a resolution of the President "On measures to organize the activities of the Victory Park Memorial Complex" was adopted, according to which, the activities of the Victory Park Memorial Complex are organized under the Ministry of Defense. With this being the case, the complex is classified as a state institution and a legal entity. As such, it has its own development fund. The head of the complex considered to be a special advisor to the Minister of Defense is appointed and dismissed by the Minister of Defense in agreement with the Minister of Culture.

The Center for Spirituality and Enlightenment, the Department of Information and Mass Communications, the Military Band Service and the Central Song and Dance Ensemble of the Armed Forces are located on the territory of the Complex.

Tree of Peace 

A Tree of Peace (Quercus robur) was planted at the park on 15 March 2021, as the first foreign tree in the park. The Tree of Peace is an international project that originated in Slovakia in 2018, organized by non-governmental association Servare et Manere with the support of the Ministry of Foreign and European Affairs of the Slovak Republic. Ján Bóry, the Slovak Ambassador to Uzbekistan and Rustambek Qurbanov, Chairman of the Committee on Friendship and International Relations with foreign countries under the Cabinet of Ministers of Uzbekistan, participated together in the planting.

References

Buildings and structures in Tashkent
Uzbekistan
Monuments and memorials in Uzbekistan